Heartbreak Hill may refer to:

Places
Heartbreak Hill refers to several ascents in footraces considered difficult for the runners:
in the Boston Marathon, Heartbreak Hill is an ascent about 20 miles from the start
in the City2Surf (Sydney), Heartbreak Hill is a 2 km incline on New South Head Road starting about 6 km into the race
a steep sand dune located at Cable Beach in Broome, Western Australia, popular with tourists and locals for walking.
Heartbreak Hill, a set of locks more formally known as the Cheshire Locks on the Trent and Mersey Canal
Heartbreak Hill, local name for a work program operational in Redcar and Cleveland from 1932 to 1938, officially known as the Cleveland Work Camps

Music
Heartbreak Hill (band), a Canadian country music band
Heartbreak Hill (album), an album by English band Strawbs (1978–1995)
"Heartbreak Hill" (song), a song by Emmylou Harris from Bluebird (1989)
Heartbreak Hill, an album by English guitarist Albert Lee (2003)